Their Greatest Hits is a greatest hits album by Hot Chocolate. It was released in 1993 by EMI Records and peaked at number one on the UK Albums Chart.

Track listing
You Sexy Thing
It Started With a Kiss
Brother Louie
Girl Crazy
So You Win Again
Put Your Love in Me
Love Is Life
I'll Put You Together Again
No Doubt About It
Everyone's a Winner
Emma
I Gave You My Heart (Didn't I)
You Could've Been a Lady
Disco Queen
Don't Stop It Now
A Child's Prayer
What Kinda Boy You're Lookin' For (Girl)
I Believe (In Love)
Are You Getting Enough Happiness?

Chart performance

Weekly charts

Year-end charts

References

Hot Chocolate (band) albums
1993 greatest hits albums